The 2021 Georgia State Panthers football team represented Georgia State University (GSU) during the 2021 NCAA Division I FBS football season. The Panthers were led by fifth-year head coach Shawn Elliott. This was the Panthers' ninth season in the Sun Belt Conference, fourth within the East Division, and 12th since the inception of the program. They played their home games at Center Parc Stadium.

Previous season
The Panthers finished 2020 with a 6–4 record (4–4 in conference), good enough for third in the Sun Belt East Division. The Panthers finished the season with a win in the 2020 LendingTree Bowl against Western Kentucky.

Preseason

Recruiting class

|}
Source:

Award watch lists
Listed in the order that they were released

Preseason

Sources:

Sun Belt coaches poll
The Sun Belt coaches poll was released on July 20, 2021. The Panthers were picked to finish third in the East Division.

Sun Belt Preseason All-Conference teams

Offense

1st team
Destin coates – Running Back, SR
Shamarious gilmore – Offensive Lineman, RS-SR
Sam pinckney – Wide Receiver, RS-JR

2nd team
Roger Carter – Tight End, SR
Cornelius mccoy – Wide Receiver, SR

Defense

2nd team
Hardrick willis – Defensive Lineman, RS-SR
Dontae wilson – Defensive Lineman, SR
Antavious lane – Defensive Back, RS-SO
Quavian white – Defensive Back, SR

Special teams

1st team
Noel ruiz – Kicker, SR

Personnel

Schedule
The 2021 schedule consists of 6 home and 6 away games in the regular season. The Panthers will travel to Sun Belt foes Louisiana–Monroe, Georgia Southern, Louisiana, and Coastal Carolina. Georgia State will play host to Sun Belt foes Appalachian State,  Texas State, Arkansas State, and Troy.

The Panthers will host two of the three non-conference opponents at Center Parc Stadium, Army, a FBS Independent and Charlotte of the Conference USA, and will travel to North Carolina of the Atlantic Coast Conference and Auburn of the Southeastern Conference.

Game summaries

Army West Point

at North Carolina

Charlotte

at Auburn

Appalachian State

at Louisiana–Monroe

Texas State

at Georgia Southern

at Louisiana

at Coastal Carolina

Arkansas State

Troy

vs. Ball State (Camellia Bowl)

References

Georgia State
Georgia State Panthers football seasons
Camellia Bowl champion seasons
Georgia State Panthers football